Jennifer Lucy Allan, known informally as Jen, is a British writer, researcher and radio presenter.

Allan has written for The Guardian The Quietus, and The Wire, being online editor for the latter. She was a presenter on Resonance FM, and in autumn 2019 became a co-host of BBC Radio 3 programme Late Junction, alternating with Verity Sharp. This followed previous guest slots presenting special editions of the show, starting from 24 July 2018.

Allan has a particular interest in foghorns, and following a PhD on the subject at University of the Arts London, her history book The Foghorn’s Lament was published in 2021. She co-led University of the Arts' "Large Objects Moving Air 2018" conference, which featured James Dooley and Chris Watson among its keynote speakers.

In February/ March 2018, she spent a month as writer in residence at Sumburgh Head Lighthouse on the Shetland mainland.

She teaches an eight-week evening course in music journalism.

Selected publications

  (About John Tyndall)
  (About the lighthouse foghorn at Cloch)

References

External links 
 
 
 Day of Radio – There are Foghorns in Japan – audio of programme presented by Allan
 Turning Point with Jennifer Lucy Allan (Writer) – audio of interview with Allan
 Allan's A Shetland Lighthouse Diary (series of four)

British music journalists
British radio presenters
21st-century British journalists
21st-century British women writers
BBC people
Year of birth missing (living people)
Living people
Place of birth missing (living people)
Alumni of the University of Sheffield
Alumni of the University of London
City, University of London
The Guardian journalists